We the Generation is the second studio album by British drum and bass band Rudimental. The album was released on 2 October 2015, although the album leaked online a week prior to its release.

The album contains a number of collaborations with singers Will Heard and Anne-Marie, as well as appearances from Ed Sheeran, Lianne La Havas, Dizzee Rascal, Foy Vance, Ella Eyre, MNEK and Bobby Womack. A number of singles were released from the album prior to its release, including "Bloodstream", featuring Sheeran.

Singles
 "Bloodstream", with collaboration Ed Sheeran, was released as the album's first single on 29 March 2015. It is a re-work of the original song which features on Sheeran's album x. The song reached number two on the UK Singles Chart.
 "Never Let You Go", featuring Foy Vance, was released as the album's second single on 12 June 2015. The track premiered on 27 April 2015 as BBC Radio 1 DJ Annie Mac's Hottest Record in the World. A music video was produced for the song which features the band as well as shots of Ukraine, Los Angeles, Morocco and the band's native United Kingdom. The single peaked at number 29 on the UK Singles Chart.
 "I Will for Love", featuring Will Heard, was released as the album's third single on 31 July 2015. The single did not chart on the UK Singles Chart, becoming the band's first single since "Spoons" not to reach the top 100. The single was later re-released alongside a remix EP, but again did not chart.
 "Rumour Mill", featuring both Anne-Marie and Will Heard, was released as the album's fourth single on 28 August 2015. The track had previously premiered on 19 June 2015 on BBC Radio 1, and a promotional video was released on 22 June 2015. Following the single's release in the form of a remix EP, the single charted at number 67 on the UK Singles Chart.
 "Lay It All on Me", also featuring Ed Sheeran, was released as the album's fifth single. The track premiered on 25 September 2015. The music video was released on 6 November 2015.
 "Common Emotion", featuring MNEK, was released as the album's sixth single on 25 March 2016.

Promotional singles
 "Love Ain't Just a Word", featuring Anne-Marie and Dizzee Rascal, was released as an instant grat single from the album on 17 July 2015. This subsequently resulted in the track peaking at number 108 on the UK Singles Chart. A promotional video for the song was also released.
 "We the Generation", featuring Mahalia, was released as a second instant grat single from the album on 18 September 2015, alongside the remix EP of the single "I Will for Love". The song did not chart on the UK Singles Chart.

Track listing

Notes
Credits adapted from album liner notes.
On physical copies of the deluxe edition, "All That Love" and "Treading on Water" switch positions.

Charts and certifications

Charts

Certifications

Release history

References

Rudimental albums
2015 albums
Asylum Records albums
Atlantic Records albums
Black Butter Records albums
Major Tom's albums